Americas' SAP Users' Group (ASUG) is an SAP user group.

History 

In 1990, SAP customers who attended the SAP annual conference “SAPPHIRE” to form an SAP users' group. In 1991, the Americas' SAP Users' Group (ASUG) was created. ASUG works with SAP in order to deliver education and training, networking, research, and influence to ASUG members. As a result of this partnership, ASUG Annual Conference shares a location with SAP's annual SAPPHIRE NOW event.

In 2016, ASUG acquired The Eventful Group's North American assets. In 2016 ASUG also launched the ASUG University program, which is delivered through both hands-on and virtual methods.

Furthermore, ASUG is one of the 12 members of the SAP User Group Executive Network (SUGEN) which is the international voice for regional SAP User Groups.

Mission and current operations 
ASUG is the world's largest SAP user group. Originally founded by a group of visionary SAP customers in 1991, its mission is to help people and organizations get the most value from their investment in SAP technology. ASUG currently serves thousands of businesses via companywide memberships, connecting more than 130,000 professionals with networking and educational resources to help them master new challenges. Through in-person and virtual events, on-demand digital resources, and ongoing advocacy for its membership, ASUG helps SAP customers make more possible.

ASUG facts 

 38 regional North American chapters that host face-to-face and virtual meetings as part of membership benefits
 30+ primary research studies annually
 20,000+ attendees join together at SAPPHIRE NOW and ASUG Annual Conference (co-hosted by SAP and ASUG)
 100+ regional, industry, and interest-based networking groups
 300+ face-to-face events annually
 400+ virtual education opportunities annually

ASUG events 
ASUG offers a full slate of virtual and in-person events crafted around key topics of interest for specific industries, business roles, and technologies. Visit ASUG.com/events for information on its wide range of events for SAP professionals.

References

User groups
SAP SE
Organizations established in 1991
Non-profit organizations based in Chicago